Les doigts de l'homme is a French gypsy jazz-inspired hot club jazz band.

History 
Formed in 2003, the group's fourth full-length album, 1910, was the first to be distributed in North America.

Members 
Olivier Kikteff
Tanguy Blum
Yannick Alcocer
Benoit Convert
Antoine Girard

Influences 
The band is heavily influenced by the work of Django Reinhardt, and their album 1910 is named after the year of his birth.

Albums 
Dans le monde (2003)
Gipsy jazz nucléaire (2004)
Les Doigts de l'homme (2005)
Les Doigts dans la prise (2008)
1910 (2010)
Mumbo Jumbo (2013)
Le coeur des vivants (2017)

References

External links 

French jazz ensembles
Gypsy jazz musicians